Bhai Gurdas College of Law commonly known as BGCL is a private law school situated beside Patiala Road, Sangrur in the Indian state of Punjab. It offers undergraduate 3 years law courses, 5 year Integrated B.A. LL.B. courses is approved by Bar Council of India (BCI), New Delhi and affiliated to Punjabi University.

History
Bhai Gurdas College of Law was established in 2003 by Bhai Gurdas Technical Education Trust, named after the great Sikh sant and poet Bhai Gurdas.

References

Law schools in Punjab, India
Educational institutions established in 2003
2003 establishments in Punjab, India